Delicious Orchards is a farm and country food market located in Colts Neck, New Jersey, United States.

History
Delicious Orchards began in 1911 as a small orchard located on a farm road (present day CR 537), connecting Colts Neck with Freehold. The Applegate family, of Freehold Township, bought the orchard in 1922, having three generations of the family run the farm. The orchard eventually grew to 110 acres throughout the years.

In the 1950s, Carroll W. Barclay, the son of the original owners, took over the operation of the farm. He altered the concept of the business from being strictly wholesale to a combination of retail. In 1959, Barclay hauled several wagonloads of apples to the roadside and set up a makeshift stand. This concept was a success, and in 1960, a  stand was built, which led to modern day Delicious Orchards. Carolyn Barclay Smith and her husband William E. Smith joined their brother Carroll and ran the store and farm for nearly 25 years . They shared the dedication to quality which was the foundation of the business . Product lines were expanded to include fresh apple cider and his wife Janet's apple pie. Several varieties of apples were grown and hand-picked for the best flavor at their peak season.

In the 1960s, the Barclay's transitioned to a year-round business with the addition of more produce and baked goods. In 1966, the Barclay's bought a building on Route 34 at the current location of Delicious Orchards. Having the business indoors created some additions to the product line, including citrus fruits and cheeses.

The farm today
Over 2.5 million people visit Delicious Orchards annually. As of 2011, the farm has 250 employees, with 300 employed during the fall. Patrons have a variety of fresh foods from several departments of Delicious Orchards. These include produce, deli, bakery, coffee and tea, seafood, smoothie/juice bar, prepared foods, organic foods, and candy. Their services also include, personalized gift baskets, catering, and curbside service.

Delicious Orchards is now owned and operated by Bill and Linda McDonald along with their four children Keri, Chris, Mike and Erin.

The farm is located on Route 34 between Route 18 and County Route 537. Most visitors come from the Monmouth County area, as well as those from New York City and the Jersey Shore.

Trivia
Rock musician and Monmouth County native Bruce Springsteen has visited Delicious Orchards, which whom he favors the farm's homemade apple pies.

Marlboro, New Jersey native Melissa Rauch and former Colts Neck resident Queen Latifah also have been known to frequent Delicious Orchards.

References

External links 

 

Buildings and structures in Monmouth County, New Jersey
Colts Neck Township, New Jersey
Farms in New Jersey
Tourist attractions in Monmouth County, New Jersey